William Earle Schreiber (December 20, 1880 – November 5, 1965) was an American college football player and coach. He served as the head football coach at the University of Wisconsin–Whitewater from 1912 to 1917.

References

External links
 

1880 births
1965 deaths
American men's basketball players
Basketball coaches from Missouri
Oklahoma State Cowboys football coaches
Wisconsin Badgers football players
Wisconsin Badgers men's basketball players
Wisconsin–Whitewater Warhawks football coaches
Wisconsin–Whitewater Warhawks men's basketball coaches
People from Carrollton, Missouri
Players of American football from Missouri
Basketball players from Missouri